Sir Ralph Howard Fowler  (17 January 1889 – 28 July 1944) was a British physicist and astronomer.

Education
Fowler was born at Roydon, Essex, on 17 January 1889 to Howard Fowler, from Burnham, Somerset, and Frances Eva, daughter of George Dewhurst, a cotton merchant from Manchester. He was initially educated at home, going on to attend Evans' preparatory school at Horris Hill and Winchester College. He won a scholarship to Trinity College, Cambridge and studied mathematics, becoming a wrangler in Part II of the Mathematical Tripos.

War service
In World War I he obtained a commission in the Royal Marine Artillery and was seriously wounded in his shoulder in the Gallipoli campaign. The wound enabled his friend Archibald Hill to use his talents properly. As Hill's second in command he worked on anti-aircraft ballistics in the Anti-Aircraft Experimental Section of HMS Excellent on Whale Island. He made a major contribution on the aerodynamics of spinning shells. He was awarded the OBE in 1918.

Academic career
In 1919, Fowler returned to Trinity and was appointed college lecturer in mathematics in 1920. Here he worked on thermodynamics and statistical mechanics, bringing a new approach to physical chemistry. With Arthur Milne, a comrade during the war, he wrote a seminal work on stellar spectra, temperatures, and pressures. In 1925 he was made a Fellow of the Royal Society. He became research supervisor to Paul Dirac and, in 1926, worked with him on the statistical mechanics of white dwarf stars. In 1927 he was one of the participants of the fifth Solvay Conference on Physics that took place at the International Solvay Institute for Physics in Belgium. In 1928 he published (with Lothar Nordheim) a seminal paper that explained the physical phenomenon now known as field electron emission, and helped to establish the validity of modern electron band theory. In 1931, he was the first to formulate and label the zeroth law of thermodynamics. In 1932 he was elected to the Chair of Theoretical Physics at the Cavendish Laboratory.

In 1939, when World War II began, he resumed his work with the Ordnance Board, despite poor health, and was chosen for scientific liaison with Canada and the United States. He knew America well, having visiting professorships at Princeton and the University of Wisconsin–Madison. For this liaison work he was knighted in 1942 (see MAUD Committee). He returned to Britain later in the war and worked for the Ordnance Board and the Admiralty up until a few weeks before his death in 1944.

Fifteen Fellows of the Royal Society and three Nobel Laureates (Chandrasekhar, Dirac, and Mott) were supervised by Fowler between 1922 and 1939. In addition to Milne, he worked with Sir Arthur Eddington, Subrahmanyan Chandrasekhar, Paul Dirac and Sir William McCrea. It was Fowler who introduced Dirac to quantum theory in 1923. Fowler also put Dirac and Werner Heisenberg in touch with each other through Niels Bohr. At Cambridge he supervised the doctoral studies of 64 students, including John Lennard-Jones, Paul Dirac and Garrett Birkhoff.

The Fowler Islands, in Crystal Sound, on the Antarctic Peninsula were named by the UK Antarctic Place-Names Committee in his honour.

Personal life
Fowler was a keen amateur cricketer who played as a wicket-keeper. He played for Norfolk in the Minor Counties Championship in 1908 and 1909.

In 1921 he married Eileen Mary (1901–1930), the only daughter of Ernest Rutherford. They had four children, two daughters and two sons. Eileen died after the birth of their last child, Ruth Fowler Edwards, a geneticist and wife of  Robert G. (Bob) Edwards, the "father" of in vitro fertilization and 2010 Nobel Prize in Physiology or Medicine laureate. One of his grandchildren is Mary Fowler, a geophysicist and the sixth Master (2012–2020) of Darwin College, Cambridge.

Selected publications
 
 

with E. A. Guggenheim:

References

External links
 Biography of Ernest Rutherford, with names of Ralph & Eileen's children
 Ralph Howard Fowler Trinity College Chapel

1889 births
1944 deaths
People from Roydon, Essex
People educated at Winchester College
Alumni of Trinity College, Cambridge
British physicists
Fellows of the Royal Society
Military personnel from Essex
Fellows of the American Physical Society
Royal Marines officers
Royal Marines personnel of World War I
Royal Medal winners
English cricketers
Norfolk cricketers
Officers of the Order of the British Empire
Wicket-keepers
John Humphrey Plummer Professors